The Sharjah Chair in Islamic Law and Finance is a professorship or chair in the Institute for Middle East and Islamic Studies, which forms part of the School of Government and International Affairs at Durham University. The Chair is named after the Sharjah emirate whose Emir Sheikh Sultan bin Muhammad Al-Qasimi originally endowed the chair in 2008.

List of Sharjah Professors
 2008–Present Professor Habib Ahmed

See also
Durham University
Van Mildert Professor of Divinity
Lightfoot Professor of Divinity

References

Islamic Law and Finance, Sharjah
Islamic Law and Finance, Sharjah
Islamic Law and Finance, Sharjah